The 2010 Men's Queensland Basketball League season was the 25th running of the competition. The Rockhampton Rockets won the championship in 2010 to claim their third league title.

The teams for this season were: Brisbane Capitals, Bundaberg Bulls, Caboolture Suns, Cairns Marlins, Gladstone Port City Power, Gold Coast Goannas, Ipswich Force, Mackay Meteors, Maroochydore Clippers, Northside Wizards, Rockhampton Rockets, South West Metro Pirates, Toowoomba Mountaineers and Townsville Heat.

Team information

Standings

Finals

*The team that finishes 1st overall goes straight through to the semi-finals.

**The top two teams from each pool face-off in the quarter-finals.

QF 1: 1st in Pool A vs. 2nd in Pool A
QF 2: 1st in Pool B vs. 2nd in Pool C
QF 3: 1st in Pool C vs. 2nd in Pool B

Awards

Statistics leaders

Regular season
 Most Valuable Player: Daniel Egan (Townsville Heat)
 Coach of the Year: Leonard King (Mackay Meteors)
 U23 Youth Player of the Year: Jeromie Hill (Cairns Marlins)
 All-League Team:
 G: Rhys Martin (Mackay Meteors)
 G: Chris Goulding (Northside Wizards)
 F: Matthew Hanson (Bundaberg Bulls)
 F: Daniel Egan (Townsville Heat)
 C: Ryan McDade (Rockhampton Rockets)

Finals
 Grand Final MVP: Peni Nasalo (Rockhampton Rockets)

References

External links
 2010 QBL Official Draw
 2010 QBL Playoffs
 Now Bring on the Meteors; Gold Coast Put to the Sword as Rockets Move into Grand Final

2010
2009–10 in Australian basketball
2010–11 in Australian basketball